Echinosoma is a genus of earwigs in the family Pygidicranidae, erected by Audinet-Serville in 1838.

Taxonomy
Echinosoma is the type genus of the subfamily Echinosomatinae recorded from Indochina and Malesia. The Dermaptera Species File lists:
 Echinosoma bifurcatus (Liu, Zhou & Bi, 2010)
 Echinosoma affine Hincks, 1959
 Echinosoma afrum (Palisot de Beauvois, 1805) - type species
 Echinosoma atrum Steinmann, 1983
 Echinosoma beccarii Srivastava, 1983
 Echinosoma bolivari Rodzianko, 1897
 Echinosoma burri Hincks, 1959
 Echinosoma celebense Hincks, 1959
 Echinosoma concolor Borelli, 1907
 Echinosoma congolense Borelli, 1907
 Echinosoma convolutum Hincks, 1959
 Echinosoma denticulatum Hincks, 1959
 Echinosoma excisum Bey-Bienko, 1970
 Echinosoma forbesi Kirby, 1891
 Echinosoma formosanum Hincks, 1959
 Echinosoma forsitan Steinmann, 1986
 Echinosoma fuscum Borelli, 1907
 Echinosoma garoense Biswas, Lahiri & Ghosh, 1974
 Echinosoma grossum Brindle, 1973
 Echinosoma hebardi Hincks, 1957
 Echinosoma horridum Dohrn, 1862
 Echinosoma insulanum Karsch, 1885
 Echinosoma komodense Bey-Bienko, 1970
 Echinosoma micropteryx Günther, 1929
 Echinosoma occidentale de Bormans, 1893
 Echinosoma pallidicolle Hincks, 1959
 Echinosoma parvulum Dohrn, 1862
 Echinosoma philippinense Hincks, 1959
 Echinosoma roseiventre Kamimura & Nishikawa, 2016
 Echinosoma rufomarginatum Borelli, 1931
 Echinosoma sarawacense Hincks, 1959
 Echinosoma setulosum Hincks, 1959
 Echinosoma sumatranum (Haan, 1842)
 Echinosoma tigrina Brindle, 1967
 Echinosoma trilineatum Borelli, 1921
 Echinosoma wahlbergi Dohrn, 1862
 Echinosoma yorkense Dohrn, 1869

Genus Parapsalis
Authority: Borelli, 1921
 Parapsalis infernalis (Burr, 1913)
 Parapsalis laevis Borelli, 1921 - type species

References

External links
 

Earwigs
Dermaptera genera